Lophodolos is a genus of dreamers.

Species
There are currently two recognized species in this genus:
 Lophodolos acanthognathus Regan, 1925 (Whalehead dreamer)
 Lophodolos indicus Lloyd, 1909

References

Oneirodidae
Marine fish genera